José Obial (born 6 March 1914, date of death unknown) was a Filipino swimmer. He competed in two events at the 1936 Summer Olympics.

References

External links
 

1914 births
Year of death missing
Filipino male swimmers
Olympic swimmers of the Philippines
Swimmers at the 1936 Summer Olympics
Place of birth missing